The 2021 Boise State Broncos football team represented Boise State University in the 2021 NCAA Division I FBS football season. The Broncos were led by first–year head coach Andy Avalos and played their home games at Albertsons Stadium in Boise, Idaho. They completed as members of the Mountain Division of the Mountain West Conference.

The Broncos completed their regular season with a 7–5 record and accepted a bid to the Arizona Bowl, where they were due to face the Central Michigan Chippewas. On December 27, Barstool Sports (the title sponsor of the bowl) founder David Portnoy announced the withdrawal of the Broncos from the bowl due to COVID-19 issues within the program; organizers stated that they would attempt to secure a replacement team to face the Chippewas. Later in the day, the Arizona Bowl was canceled, and Central Michigan was named as a replacement team for the Sun Bowl.

Previous season

The Broncos finished the 2020 season 5–2 overall, and 5–0 in conference play, claiming a championship game berth in the Mountain West Championship Game, where they lost to San Jose State 34–20. The Broncos announced on December 20 that they would forego playing in a bowl game, ending a streak of 18 consecutive bowl games.

Boise State head coach Bryan Harsin resigned on December 22 to become head coach at Auburn in the Southeastern Conference (SEC), taking most of his assistant coaches. The university named Oregon defensive coordinator and former Boise State linebacker and assistant coach Andy Avalos the program's next head coach on January 9, 2021.

Schedule

Rankings

Personnel

Game summaries

at UCF

UCF hosted Boise State in the 2021 season opener. It was the first meeting between the two Group of Five front-runners, and the first game for new head coach Gus Malzahn. The kickoff was delayed about 2 hours and 46 minutes due to lightning in the area, but the inclement weather passed and the game played to completion without additional delay. Boise State jumped out to a 21–0 lead, but UCF rallied and held on for a 36–31 victory. UCF won their sixth consecutive season opener, and 14th season opener out of the last 16 years.

On their first drive of the first quarter, quarterback Dillon Gabriel swiftly drove the Knights to the Boise State 8 yard line. However, his pass was intercepted by Tyric LeBeauf at the goal line, who ran it back 100 yards for a Broncos touchdown. Trailing 21–0, the Knights finally got on the board with a 23-yard catch and run touchdown by Alec Holler early in the second quarter. In the final minute of the second quarter, Gabriel drove the Knights down the field and with 6 seconds left in the half, scrambled to find Titus Mokiao-Atimalala just inside the pylon for a touchdown and a 24–14 score at halftime.

UCF received the opening kickoff for the second half, and the Knights scored again. This time a touchdown pass from Gabriel to Brandon Johnson, who caught the ball on the right side of the endzone, his foot just inches from being out-of-bounds. With 56 seconds left in the third quarter, the Knights took the lead for the first time. Gabriel connected with Jaylon Robinson for a 23-yard over-the-shoulder touchdown pass, and a 28–24 lead.

The Knights defense stiffened in the second half, forcing the Broncos into three three-and-outs along with a safety. With UCF leading 30–24, momentum shifted back to the Broncos after Tyric LeBeauf intercepted Gabriel for the second time. The turnover led to a Boise State touchdown, and the Knights trailed by 1 point with 8 minutes left in regulation.

Gabriel drove the Knights 75 yards in ten plays (including a Targeting penalty by the Broncos), capped off with a 9-yard go-ahead touchdown run by Isaiah Bowser. With four minutes to go, the Broncos had one last chance. They drove to the UCF 35, but quarterback Hank Bachmeier was scrambling and threw up an easy interception for Dyllon Lester. The Knights were able to roll the clock down, and held on for a 36–31 victory. It matched the best comeback win in school history (21 points in 1984 & 2013). Gabriel finished the game with 318 passing yards, 64 yards rushing, and four touchdown passes, and Bowser has 32 carries for 170 yards (1 touchdown) in his Knights debut. The Knights extended their streak of scoring both a rushing touchdown and a passing touchdown to 50 consecutive games, the longest such active streak in the nation.

UTEP

Oklahoma State

at Utah State

Nevada

at No. 10 BYU

Air Force

at Colorado State

at No. 23 Fresno State

Wyoming

New Mexico

at No. 21 San Diego State

References

2021 Mountain West Conference football season
Boise State Broncos football seasons
Boise State Broncos football